Mor Aviram is an Israeli ten-pin bowler. She finished in 18th position of the combined rankings at the 2006 AMF World Cup.  She represented Israel in the 2004 and 2008 AMF World Cups as well.

Her brother, Or Aviram, is also a professional bowler, as was their mother, Sara Aviram.

References

Year of birth missing (living people)
Living people
Israeli Jews
Israeli ten-pin bowling players
Place of birth missing (living people)